Malcolm Adelbert Moody (November 30, 1854 – March 19, 1925) was an American businessman and politician who served two terms as a Republican U.S. congressman from Oregon from 1899 to 1903.

Early life
Moody was born near Brownsville in the Oregon Territory in 1854, the eldest child of future Oregon governor Zenas Ferry Moody and his wife, Mary Stevenson Moody. The Moody family moved to Illinois the following year, and then back to Oregon in 1862, settling in The Dalles. Malcolm Moody attended the public schools and then the University of California, Berkeley. He joined his father's mercantile business and worked at The Dalles National Bank.

Political career
Moody was elected to The Dalles city council in 1885, and mayor in 1889, serving two terms. In 1899, he was elected as United States Representative for Oregon's 2nd congressional district. He was handily re-elected to a second term, defeating William Smith, but lost the nomination in 1902 to John N. Williamson due to internal party struggles.  He resumed his mercantile business and did not return to public service.

Personal life
Moody never married. According to The Dalles lore, he loved two sisters, Anne and Bessie Lang, but he could not choose between them and his love was unrequited. At his death, he willed his house—the oldest home in The Dalles, now known as the Rorick House Museum—to the Lang sisters.

He died in Portland in 1925 after a long illness and is buried in Odd Fellows Cemetery in The Dalles.

References

External links

1854 births
1925 deaths
Oregon city council members
People from The Dalles, Oregon
Republican Party members of the United States House of Representatives from Oregon
University of California, Berkeley alumni
People from Brownsville, Oregon